Cornelia Elisabeth Gallas (31 January 1885 – 18 February 1967), commonly known as Corry or Corrie, was a Dutch painter. Her work was part of the painting event in the art competition at the 1932 Summer Olympics. Gallas's work has been exhibited at the Stedelijk Museum Amsterdam.

References

1885 births
1967 deaths
20th-century Dutch painters
Dutch women painters
Olympic competitors in art competitions
People from Brielle
20th-century Dutch women